Ernst Heincke (November 19, 1931 – March 8, 2015) was a German born American sprint canoer who competed in the late 1960s. He was eliminated in the repechages of the K-4 1000 m event at the 1968 Summer Olympics in Mexico City.

References
Ernst Heincke's profile at Sports Reference.com
Ernst Heincke's obituary

1931 births
2015 deaths
American male canoeists
Canoeists at the 1968 Summer Olympics
Olympic canoeists of the United States